The Antikythera mechanism is an Ancient Greek hand-powered orrery, described as the oldest known example of an analogue computer used to predict astronomical positions and eclipses decades in advance. It could also be used to track the four-year cycle of athletic games which was similar to an Olympiad, the cycle of the ancient Olympic Games.

This artefact was among wreckage retrieved from a shipwreck off the coast of the Greek island Antikythera in 1901. On 17 May 1902, it was identified as containing a gear by archaeologist Valerios Stais. The device, housed in the remains of a wooden-framed case of (uncertain) overall size , was found as one lump, later separated into three main fragments which are now divided into 82 separate fragments after conservation efforts. Four of these fragments contain gears, while inscriptions are found on many others.

In 2008, a team led by Mike Edmunds and Tony Freeth at Cardiff University used modern computer x-ray tomography and high resolution surface scanning to image inside fragments of the crust-encased mechanism and read the faintest inscriptions that once covered the outer casing of the machine. This suggests that it had 37 meshing bronze gears enabling it to follow the movements of the Moon and the Sun through the zodiac, to predict eclipses and to model the irregular orbit of the Moon, where the Moon's velocity is higher in its perigee than in its apogee. This motion was studied in the 2nd century BC by astronomer Hipparchus of Rhodes, and it is speculated that he may have been consulted in the machine's construction. There is speculation that a portion of the mechanism is missing and it also calculated the positions of the five classical planets.

The instrument is believed to have been designed and constructed by Greek scientists and has been variously dated to about 87 BC, or between 150 and 100 BC, or to 205 BC. In any case, it must have been constructed before the shipwreck, which has been dated by multiple lines of evidence to approximately 70–60 BC. In 2022 researchers proposed that the initial calibration date of the machine (not its actual date of construction) could have been 23 December 178 BC. Other experts propose 204 BC as a more likely calibration date. Machines with similar complexity did not appear again until the astronomical clocks of Richard of Wallingford and Giovanni de' Dondi in the fourteenth century.

All known fragments of the Antikythera mechanism are now kept at the National Archaeological Museum, Athens, along with a number of artistic reconstructions and replicas, to demonstrate how it may have looked and worked.

History

Discovery

Captain Dimitrios Kontos and a crew of sponge divers from Symi island discovered the Antikythera shipwreck in early 1900, and recovered artefacts during the first expedition with the Hellenic Royal Navy, in 1900–01. The team retrieved numerous large objects, including bronze and marble statues, pottery, unique glassware, jewellery, coins, and the mechanism. The mechanism was retrieved from the wreckage in 1901, most probably that July. It is not known how the mechanism came to be on the cargo ship.

All of the items retrieved from the wreckage were transferred to the National Museum of Archaeology in Athens for storage and analysis. The mechanism appeared to be a lump of corroded bronze and wood; it went unnoticed for two years, while museum staff worked on piecing together more obvious treasures, such as the statues. Upon removal from seawater, the mechanism was not treated, resulting in deformational changes.

On 17 May 1902, archaeologist Valerios Stais found that one of the pieces of rock had a gear wheel embedded in it. He initially believed that it was an astronomical clock, but most scholars considered the device to be prochronistic, too complex to have been constructed during the same period as the other pieces that had been discovered. Investigations into the object were dropped until British science historian and Yale University professor Derek J. de Solla Price became interested in it in 1951. In 1971, Price and Greek nuclear physicist Charalampos Karakalos made X-ray and gamma-ray images of the 82 fragments. Price published a 70-page paper on their findings in 1974.

Two other searches for items at the Antikythera wreck site in 2012 and 2015 have yielded art objects and a second ship which may or may not be connected with the treasure ship on which the mechanism was found. Also found was a bronze disc, embellished with the image of a bull. The disc has four "ears" which have holes in them, and it was thought by some that it may have been part of the Antikythera mechanism, as a "cog wheel". There appears to be little evidence that it was part of the mechanism; it is more likely that the disc was a bronze decoration on a piece of furniture.

Origin
The Antikythera mechanism is generally referred to as the first known analogue computer. The quality and complexity of the mechanism's manufacture suggests that it must have had undiscovered predecessors during the Hellenistic period. Its construction relied on theories of astronomy and mathematics developed by Greek astronomers during the second century BC, and it is estimated to have been built in the late second century BC or the early first century BC.

In 2008, continued research by the Antikythera Mechanism Research Project suggested that the concept for the mechanism may have originated in the colonies of Corinth, since they identified the calendar on the Metonic Spiral as coming from Corinth or one of its colonies in northwest Greece or Sicily. Syracuse was a colony of Corinth and the home of Archimedes, and the Antikythera Mechanism Research project argued in 2008 that it might imply a connection with the school of Archimedes. It was demonstrated in 2017 that the calendar on the Metonic Spiral is of the Corinthian type but cannot be that of Syracuse. Another theory suggests that coins found by Jacques Cousteau at the wreck site in the 1970s date to the time of the device's construction, and posits that its origin may have been from the ancient Greek city of Pergamon, home of the Library of Pergamum. With its many scrolls of art and science, it was second in importance only to the Library of Alexandria during the Hellenistic period.

The ship carrying the device also contained vases in the Rhodian style, leading to a hypothesis that it was constructed at an academy founded by Stoic philosopher Posidonius on that Greek island. Rhodes was a busy trading port in antiquity and a centre of astronomy and mechanical engineering, home to astronomer Hipparchus, who was active from about 140 BC to 120 BC. The mechanism uses Hipparchus' theory for the motion of the Moon, which suggests the possibility that he may have designed it or at least worked on it. It has recently been argued that the astronomical events on the Parapegma of the Antikythera mechanism work best for latitudes in the range of 33.3–37.0 degrees north; the island of Rhodes is located between the latitudes of 35.85 and 36.50 degrees north.

In 2014, a study by Carman and Evans argued for a new dating of approximately 200 BC based on identifying the start-up date on the Saros Dial as the astronomical lunar month that began shortly after the new moon of 28 April 205 BC. According to Carman and Evans, the Babylonian arithmetic style of prediction fits much better with the device's predictive models than the traditional Greek trigonometric style. A study by Paul Iversen published in 2017 reasons that the prototype for the device was from Rhodes, but that this particular model was modified for a client from Epirus in northwestern Greece; Iversen argues that it was probably constructed no earlier than a generation before the shipwreck, a date supported also by Jones.

Further dives were undertaken in 2014 and 2015, in the hope of discovering more of the mechanism. A five-year programme of investigations began in 2014 and ended in October 2019, with a new five-year session starting in May 2020.

Description
The original mechanism apparently came out of the Mediterranean as a single encrusted piece. Soon afterwards it fractured into three major pieces. Other small pieces have broken off in the interim from cleaning and handling, and others were found on the sea floor by the Cousteau expedition. Other fragments may still be in storage, undiscovered since their initial recovery; Fragment F was discovered in that way in 2005. Of the 82 known fragments, seven are mechanically significant and contain the majority of the mechanism and inscriptions. There are also 16 smaller parts that contain fractional and incomplete inscriptions.

Major fragments

Minor fragments
Many of the smaller fragments that have been found contain nothing of apparent value, but a few have inscriptions on them. Fragment 19 contains significant back door inscriptions including one reading "... 76 years ..." which refers to the Callippic cycle. Other inscriptions seem to describe the function of the back dials. In addition to this important minor fragment, 15 further minor fragments have remnants of inscriptions on them.

Mechanics
Information on the specific data gleaned from the ruins by the latest inquiries is detailed in the supplement to Freeth's 2006 Nature article.

Operation
On the front face of the mechanism, there is a fixed ring dial representing the ecliptic, the twelve zodiacal signs marked off with equal 30-degree sectors. This matched with the Babylonian custom of assigning one twelfth of the ecliptic to each zodiac sign equally, even though the constellation boundaries were variable. Outside that dial is another ring which is rotatable, marked off with the months and days of the Sothic Egyptian calendar, twelve months of 30 days plus five intercalary days. The months are marked with the Egyptian names for the months transcribed into the Greek alphabet. The first task, then, is to rotate the Egyptian calendar ring to match the current zodiac points. The Egyptian calendar ignored leap days, so it advanced through a full zodiac sign in about 120 years.

The mechanism was operated by turning a small hand crank (now lost) which was linked via a crown gear to the largest gear, the four-spoked gear visible on the front of fragment A, gear b1. This moved the date pointer on the front dial, which would be set to the correct Egyptian calendar day. The year is not selectable, so it is necessary to know the year currently set, or by looking up the cycles indicated by the various calendar cycle indicators on the back in the Babylonian ephemeris tables for the day of the year currently set, since most of the calendar cycles are not synchronous with the year. The crank moves the date pointer about 78 days per full rotation, so hitting a particular day on the dial would be easily possible if the mechanism were in good working condition. The action of turning the hand crank would also cause all interlocked gears within the mechanism to rotate, resulting in the simultaneous calculation of the position of the Sun and Moon, the moon phase, eclipse, and calendar cycles, and perhaps the locations of planets.

The operator also had to be aware of the position of the spiral dial pointers on the two large dials on the back. The pointer had a "follower" that tracked the spiral incisions in the metal as the dials incorporated four and five full rotations of the pointers. When a pointer reached the terminal month location at either end of the spiral, the pointer's follower had to be manually moved to the other end of the spiral before proceeding further.

Faces

Front face
The front dial has two concentric circular scales. The inner scale marks the Greek signs of the zodiac, with division in degrees. The outer scale, which is a moveable ring that sits flush with the surface and runs in a channel, is marked off with what appear to be days and has a series of corresponding holes beneath the ring in the channel.
 
Since the discovery of the mechanism, this outer ring has been presumed to represent the 365-day Egyptian calendar, but recent research challenges this presumption and gives evidence it is most likely divided into 354 intervals.
 
If one subscribes to the 365-day presumption, it is recognized the mechanism predates the Julian calendar reform, but the Sothic and Callippic cycles had already pointed to a 365 1⁄4-day solar year, as seen in Ptolemy III's attempted calendar reform of 238 BC. The dials are not believed to reflect his proposed leap day (Epag. 6), but the outer calendar dial may be moved against the inner dial to compensate for the effect of the extra quarter-day in the solar year by turning the scale backward one day every four years.
 
If one subscribes to the 354-day evidence, the most likely interpretation is that the ring is a manifestation of a 354-day lunar calendar. Given the era of the mechanism's presumed construction and the presence of Egyptian month names, it is possibly the first example of the Egyptian civil-based lunar calendar proposed by Richard Anthony Parker in 1950. The lunar calendar's purpose was to serve as a day-to-day indicator of successive lunations, and would also have assisted with the interpretation of the Lunar phase pointer, and the Metonic and Saros dials. Undiscovered gearing, synchronous with the rest of the Metonic gearing of the mechanism, is implied to drive a pointer around this scale. Movement and registration of the ring relative to the underlying holes served to facilitate both a one-in-76-year Callippic cycle correction, as well as convenient lunisolar intercalation.

The dial also marks the position of the Sun on the ecliptic corresponds to the current date in the year. The orbits of the Moon and the five planets known to the Greeks are close enough to the ecliptic to make it a convenient reference for defining their positions as well.

The following three Egyptian months are inscribed in Greek letters on the surviving pieces of the outer ring:
  (Pachon)
  (Payni)
  (Epiphi)

The other months have been reconstructed; some reconstructions of the mechanism omit the five days of the Egyptian intercalary month. The Zodiac dial contains Greek inscriptions of the members of the zodiac, which is believed to be adapted to the tropical month version rather than the sidereal:

  ( [Ram], Aries)
 ΤΑΥΡΟΣ (Tauros [Bull], Taurus)
 ΔΙΔΥΜΟΙ (Didymoi [Twins], Gemini)
 ΚΑΡΚΙΝΟΣ (Karkinos [Crab], Cancer)
 ΛΕΩΝ (Leon [Lion], Leo)
 ΠΑΡΘΕΝΟΣ (Parthenos [Maiden], Virgo)
 ΧΗΛΑΙ (Chelai [Scorpio's Claw or Zygos], Libra)
 ΣΚΟΡΠΙΟΣ (Skorpios [Scorpion], Scorpio)
 ΤΟΞΟΤΗΣ (Toxotes [Archer], Sagittarius)
 ΑΙΓΟΚΕΡΩΣ (Aigokeros [Goat-horned], Capricorn)
 ΥΔΡΟΧΟΟΣ (Hydrokhoos [Water carrier], Aquarius)
 ΙΧΘΥΕΣ (Ichthyes [Fish], Pisces)

Also on the zodiac dial are a number of single characters at specific points (see reconstruction here:). They are keyed to a parapegma, a precursor of the modern day almanac inscribed on the front face above and beneath the dials. They mark the locations of longitudes on the ecliptic for specific stars. The parapegma above the dials reads (square brackets indicate inferred text):

The parapegma beneath the dials reads:

At least two pointers indicated positions of bodies upon the ecliptic. A lunar pointer indicated the position of the Moon, and a mean Sun pointer also was shown, perhaps doubling as the current date pointer. The Moon position was not a simple mean Moon indicator that would indicate movement uniformly around a circular orbit; it approximated the acceleration and deceleration of the Moon's elliptical orbit, through the earliest extant use of epicyclic gearing.

It also tracked the precession of the elliptical orbit around the ecliptic in an 8.88-year cycle. The mean Sun position is, by definition, the current date. It is speculated that since such pains were taken to get the position of the Moon correct, then there also was likely to have been a "true sun" pointer in addition to the mean Sun pointer likewise, to track the elliptical anomaly of the Sun (the orbit of Earth around the Sun), but there is no evidence of it among the ruins of the mechanism found to date. Similarly, neither is there the evidence of planetary orbit pointers for the five planets known to the Greeks among the ruins. See Proposed planet indication gearing schemes below.

Mechanical engineer Michael Wright demonstrated that there was a mechanism to supply the lunar phase in addition to the position. The indicator was a small ball embedded in the lunar pointer, half-white and half-black, which rotated to show the phase (new, first quarter, half, third quarter, full, and back) graphically. The data to support this function is available given the Sun and Moon positions as angular rotations; essentially, it is the angle between the two, translated into the rotation of the ball. It requires a differential gear, a gearing arrangement that sums or differences two angular inputs.

Rear face

In July 2008, scientists reported new findings in the journal Nature showing that the mechanism not only tracked the Metonic calendar and predicted solar eclipses, but also calculated the timing of several panhellenic athletic games, including the Ancient Olympic Games. Inscriptions on the instrument closely match the names of the months that are used on calendars from Epirus in northwestern Greece and with the island of Corfu, which in antiquity was known as Corcyra.

On the back of the mechanism, there are five dials: the two large displays, the Metonic and the Saros, and three smaller indicators, the so-called Olympiad Dial, which has recently been renamed the Games dial as it did not track Olympiad years (the four-year cycle it tracks most closely is the Halieiad), the Callippic, and the Exeligmos.

The Metonic Dial is the main upper dial on the rear of the mechanism. The Metonic cycle, defined in several physical units, is 235 synodic months, which is very close (to within less than 13 one-millionths) to 19 tropical years. It is therefore a convenient interval over which to convert between lunar and solar calendars. The Metonic dial covers 235 months in five rotations of the dial, following a spiral track with a follower on the pointer that keeps track of the layer of the spiral. The pointer points to the synodic month, counted from new moon to new moon, and the cell contains the Corinthian month names.

 
 ΚΡΑΝΕΙΟΣ (Kraneios)
 ΛΑΝΟΤΡΟΠΙΟΣ (Lanotropios)
 ΜΑΧΑΝΕΥΣ (Machaneus, "mechanic", referring to Zeus the inventor)
 ΔΩΔΕΚΑΤΕΥΣ (Dodekateus)
 ΕΥΚΛΕΙΟΣ (Eukleios)
 ΑΡΤΕΜΙΣΙΟΣ (Artemisios)
 ΨΥΔΡΕΥΣ (Psydreus)
 ΓΑΜΕΙΛΙΟΣ (Gameilios)
 ΑΓΡΙΑΝΙΟΣ (Agrianios)
 ΠΑΝΑΜΟΣ (Panamos)
 ΑΠΕΛΛΑΙΟΣ (Apellaios)

Thus, setting the correct solar time (in days) on the front panel indicates the current lunar month on the back panel, with resolution to within a week or so.

Based on the fact that the calendar month names are consistent with all the evidence of the Epirote calendar and that the Games dial mentions the very minor Naa games of Dodona (in Epirus), it has recently been argued that the calendar on the Antikythera Mechanism is likely to be the Epirote calendar, and that this calendar was probably adopted from a Corinthian colony in Epirus, possibly Ambracia. It has also been argued that the first month of the calendar, Phoinikaios, was ideally the month in which the autumn equinox fell, and that the start-up date of the calendar began shortly after the astronomical new moon of 23 August 205 BC.

The Games dial is the right secondary upper dial; it is the only pointer on the instrument that travels in a counter-clockwise direction as time advances. The dial is divided into four sectors, each of which is inscribed with a year indicator and the name of two Panhellenic Games: the "crown" games of Isthmia, Olympia, Nemea, and Pythia; and two lesser games: Naa (held at Dodona), and the sixth and final set of Games recently deciphered as the Halieia of Rhodes. The inscriptions on each one of the four divisions are:

The Saros dial is the main lower spiral dial on the rear of the mechanism. The Saros cycle is 18 years and  days long (6585.333... days), which is very close to 223 synodic months (6585.3211 days). It is defined as the cycle of repetition of the positions required to cause solar and lunar eclipses, and therefore, it could be used to predict them—not only the month, but the day and time of day. Note that the cycle is approximately 8 hours longer than an integer number of days. Translated into global spin, that means an eclipse occurs not only eight hours later, but one-third of a rotation farther to the west. Glyphs in 51 of the 223 synodic month cells of the dial specify the occurrence of 38 lunar and 27 solar eclipses. Some of the abbreviations in the glyphs read:
 Σ = ΣΕΛΗΝΗ ("Selene", Moon)
 Η = ΗΛΙΟΣ ("Helios", Sun)
 H\M = ΗΜΕΡΑΣ ("Hemeras", of the day)
 ω\ρ = ωρα ("hora", hour)
 N\Y = ΝΥΚΤΟΣ ("Nuktos", of the night)

The glyphs show whether the designated eclipse is solar or lunar, and give the day of the month and hour. Solar eclipses may not be visible at any given point, and lunar eclipses are visible only if the moon is above the horizon at the appointed hour. In addition, the inner lines at the cardinal points of the Saros dial indicate the start of a new full moon cycle. Based on the distribution of the times of the eclipses, it has recently been argued that the start-up date of the Saros dial was shortly after the astronomical new moon of 28 April 205 BC.

The Exeligmos Dial is the secondary lower dial on the rear of the mechanism. The Exeligmos cycle is a 54-year triple Saros cycle that is 19,756 days long. Since the length of the Saros cycle is to a third of a day (namely, 6,585 days plus 8 hours), a full Exeligmos cycle returns the counting to an integral number of days, as reflected in the inscriptions. The labels on its three divisions are:
 Blank or o ? (representing the number zero, assumed, not yet observed)
 H (number 8) means add 8 hours to the time mentioned in the display
 Iϛ (number 16) means add 16 hours to the time mentioned in the display

Thus the dial pointer indicates how many hours must be added to the glyph times of the Saros dial in order to calculate the exact eclipse times.

Doors
The mechanism has a wooden casing with a front and a back door, both containing inscriptions. The back door appears to be the "instruction manual". On one of its fragments is written "76 years, 19 years" representing the Callippic and Metonic cycles. Also written is "223" for the Saros cycle. On another one of its fragments, it is written "on the spiral subdivisions 235" referring to the Metonic dial.

Gearing
The mechanism is remarkable for the level of miniaturisation and the complexity of its parts, which is comparable to that of fourteenth-century astronomical clocks. It has at least 30 gears, although mechanism expert Michael Wright has suggested that the Greeks of this period were capable of implementing a system with many more gears.

There is much debate as to whether the mechanism had indicators for all five of the planets known to the ancient Greeks. No gearing for such a planetary display survives and all gears are accounted for—with the exception of one 63-toothed gear (r1) otherwise unaccounted for in fragment D.

Fragment D is a small quasi-circular constriction that, according to Xenophon Moussas, has a gear inside a somewhat larger hollow gear. The inner gear moves inside the outer gear reproducing an epicyclical motion that, with a pointer, gives the position of planet Jupiter. The inner gear is numbered 45, "ME" in Greek and the same number is written on two surfaces of this small cylindrical box.

The purpose of the front face was to position astronomical bodies with respect to the celestial sphere along the ecliptic, in reference to the observer's position on the Earth. That is irrelevant to the question of whether that position was computed using a heliocentric or geocentric view of the Solar System; either computational method should, and does, result in the same position (ignoring ellipticity), within the error factors of the mechanism.

The epicyclic Solar System of Ptolemy (–)—still 300 years in the future from the apparent date of the mechanism—carried forward with more epicycles, and was more accurate predicting the positions of planets than the view of Copernicus (1473–1543), until Kepler (1571–1630) introduced the possibility that orbits are ellipses.

Evans et al. suggest that to display the mean positions of the five classical planets would require only 17 further gears that could be positioned in front of the large driving gear and indicated using individual circular dials on the face.

Tony Freeth and Alexander Jones have modelled and published details of a version using several gear trains mechanically similar to the lunar anomaly system allowing for indication of the positions of the planets as well as synthesis of the Sun anomaly. Their system, they claim, is more authentic than Wright's model as it uses the known skill sets of the Greeks of that period and does not add excessive complexity or internal stresses to the machine.

The gear teeth were in the form of equilateral triangles with an average circular pitch of 1.6 mm, an average wheel thickness of 1.4 mm and an average air gap between gears of 1.2 mm. The teeth probably were created from a blank bronze round using hand tools; this is evident because not all of them are even. Due to advances in imaging and X-ray technology, it is now possible to know the precise number of teeth and size of the gears within the located fragments. Thus the basic operation of the device is no longer a mystery and has been replicated accurately. The major unknown remains the question of the presence and nature of any planet indicators.

A table of the gears, their teeth, and the expected and computed rotations of various important gears follows. The gear functions come from Freeth et al. (2008) and those for the lower half of the table from Freeth and Jones 2012. The computed values start with 1 year/revolution for the b1 gear, and the remainder are computed directly from gear teeth ratios. The gears marked with an asterisk (*) are missing, or have predecessors missing, from the known mechanism; these gears have been calculated with reasonable gear teeth counts.

Table notes:

There are several gear ratios for each planet that result in close matches to the correct values for synodic periods of the planets and the Sun. The ones chosen above seem to provide good accuracy with reasonable tooth counts, but the specific gears that may have been used are, and probably will remain, unknown.

Known gear scheme

It is very probable that there were planetary dials, as the complicated motions and periodicities of all planets are mentioned in the manual of the mechanism. The exact position and mechanisms for the gears of the planets is not known. There is no coaxial system but only for the Moon. Fragment D that is an epicycloidal system is considered as a planetary gear for Jupiter (Moussas, 2011, 2012, 2014) or a gear for the motion of the Sun (University of Thessaloniki group).
The Sun gear is operated from the hand-operated crank (connected to gear a1, driving the large four-spoked mean Sun gear, b1) and in turn drives the rest of the gear sets. The Sun gear is b1/b2 and b2 has 64 teeth. It directly drives the date/mean sun pointer (there may have been a second, "true sun" pointer that displayed the Sun's elliptical anomaly; it is discussed below in the Freeth reconstruction). In this discussion, reference is to modelled rotational period of various pointers and indicators; they all assume the input rotation of the b1 gear of 360 degrees, corresponding with one tropical year, and are computed solely on the basis of the gear ratios of the gears named.

The Moon train starts with gear b1 and proceeds through c1, c2, d1, d2, e2, e5, k1, k2, e6, e1, and b3 to the Moon pointer on the front face. The gears k1 and k2 form an epicyclic gear system; they are an identical pair of gears that don't mesh, but rather, they operate face-to-face, with a short pin on k1 inserted into a slot in k2. The two gears have different centres of rotation, so the pin must move back and forth in the slot. That increases and decreases the radius at which k2 is driven, also necessarily varying its angular velocity (presuming the velocity of k1 is even) faster in some parts of the rotation than others.  Over an entire revolution the average velocities are the same, but the fast-slow variation models the effects of the elliptical orbit of the Moon, in consequence of Kepler's second and third laws. The modelled rotational period of the Moon pointer (averaged over a year) is 27.321 days, compared to the modern length of a lunar sidereal month of 27.321661 days. As mentioned, the pin/slot driving of the k1/k2 gears varies the displacement over a year's time, and the mounting of those two gears on the e3 gear supplies a precessional advancement to the ellipticity modelling with a period of 8.8826 years, compared with the current value of precession period of the moon of 8.85 years.

The system also models the phases of the Moon. The Moon pointer holds a shaft along its length, on which is mounted a small gear named r, which meshes to the Sun pointer at B0 (the connection between B0 and the rest of B is not visible in the original mechanism, so whether b0 is the current date/mean Sun pointer or a hypothetical true Sun pointer is not known). The gear rides around the dial with the Moon, but is also geared to the Sun—the effect is to perform a differential gear operation, so the gear turns at the synodic month period, measuring in effect, the angle of the difference between the Sun and Moon pointers.  The gear drives a small ball that appears through an opening in the Moon pointer's face, painted longitudinally half white and half black, displaying the phases pictorially. It turns with a modelled rotational period of 29.53 days; the modern value for the synodic month is 29.530589 days.

The Metonic train is driven by the drive train b1, b2, l1, l2, m1, m2, and n1, which is connected to the pointer. The modelled rotational period of the pointer is the length of the 6939.5 days (over the whole five-rotation spiral), while the modern value for the Metonic cycle is 6939.69 days.

The Olympiad train is driven by b1, b2, l1, l2, m1, m2, n1, n2, and o1, which mounts the pointer.  It has a computed modelled rotational period of exactly four years, as expected. Incidentally, it is the only pointer on the mechanism that rotates counter-clockwise; all of the others rotate clockwise.

The Callippic train is driven by b1, b2, l1, l2, m1, m2, n1, n3, p1, p2, and q1, which mounts the pointer. It has a computed modelled rotational period of 27758 days, while the modern value is 27758.8 days.

The Saros train is driven by b1, b2, l1, l2, m1, m3, e3, e4, f1, f2, and g1, which mounts the pointer. The modelled rotational period of the Saros pointer is 1646.3 days (in four rotations along the spiral pointer track); the modern value is 1646.33 days.

The Exeligmos train is driven by b1, b2, l1, l2, m1, m3, e3, e4, f1, f2, g1, g2, h1, h2, and i1, which mounts the pointer. The modelled rotational period of the Exeligmos pointer is 19,756 days; the modern value is 19755.96 days.

Apparently, gears m3, n1-3, p1-2, and q1 did not survive in the wreckage. The functions of the pointers were deduced from the remains of the dials on the back face, and reasonable, appropriate gearage to fulfill the functions was proposed, and is generally accepted.

Reconstruction efforts

Proposed gear schemes
Because of the large space between the mean Sun gear and the front of the case and the size of and mechanical features on the mean Sun gear, it is very likely that the mechanism contained further gearing that either has been lost in or subsequent to the shipwreck or was removed before being loaded onto the ship. This lack of evidence and nature of the front part of the mechanism has led to numerous attempts to emulate what the Greeks of the period would have done and, of course, because of the lack of evidence many solutions have been put forward.

Michael Wright was the first person to design and build a model with not only the known mechanism, but also, with his emulation of a potential planetarium system. He suggested that along with the lunar anomaly, adjustments would have been made for the deeper, more basic solar anomaly (known as the "first anomaly"). He included pointers for this "true sun", Mercury, Venus, Mars, Jupiter, and Saturn, in addition to the known "mean sun" (current time) and lunar pointers.

Evans, Carman, and Thorndike published a solution with significant differences from Wright's. Their proposal centred on what they observed as irregular spacing of the inscriptions on the front dial face, which to them seemed to indicate an off-centre sun indicator arrangement; this would simplify the mechanism by removing the need to simulate the solar anomaly. They also suggested that rather than accurate planetary indication (rendered impossible by the offset inscriptions) there would be simple dials for each individual planet showing information such as key events in the cycle of planet, initial and final appearances in the night sky, and apparent direction changes. This system would lead to a much simplified gear system, with much reduced forces and complexity, as compared to Wright's model.

Their proposal used simple meshed gear trains and accounted for the previously unexplained 63 toothed gear in fragment D. They proposed two face plate layouts, one with evenly spaced dials, and another with a gap in the top of the face to account for criticism regarding their not using the apparent fixtures on the b1 gear. They proposed that rather than bearings and pillars for gears and axles, they simply held weather and seasonal icons to be displayed through a window.

In a paper published in 2012, Carman, Thorndike, and Evans also proposed a system of epicyclic gearing with pin and slot followers.

Freeth and Jones published their proposal in 2012 after extensive research and work. They came up with a compact and feasible solution to the question of planetary indication. They also propose indicating the solar anomaly (that is, the sun's apparent position in the zodiac dial) on a separate pointer from the date pointer, which indicates the mean position of the Sun, as well as the date on the month dial. If the two dials are synchronised correctly, their front panel display is essentially the same as Wright's. Unlike Wright's model however, this model has not been built physically, and is only a 3-D computer model.

The system to synthesise the solar anomaly is very similar to that used in Wright's proposal: three gears, one fixed in the centre of the b1 gear and attached to the Sun spindle, the second fixed on one of the spokes (in their proposal the one on the bottom left) acting as an idle gear, and the final positioned next to that one; the final gear is fitted with an offset pin and, over said pin, an arm with a slot that in turn, is attached to the sun spindle, inducing anomaly as the mean Sun wheel turns.

The inferior planet mechanism includes the Sun (treated as a planet in this context), Mercury, and Venus. For each of the three systems, there is an epicyclic gear whose axis is mounted on b1, thus the basic frequency is the Earth year (as it is, in truth, for epicyclic motion in the Sun and all the planets—excepting only the Moon). Each meshes with a gear grounded to the mechanism frame. Each has a pin mounted, potentially on an extension of one side of the gear that enlarges the gear, but doesn't interfere with the teeth; in some cases, the needed distance between the gear's centre and the pin is farther than the radius of the gear itself. A bar with a slot along its length extends from the pin toward the appropriate coaxial tube, at whose other end is the object pointer, out in front of the front dials. The bars could have been full gears, although there is no need for the waste of metal, since the only working part is the slot. Also, using the bars avoids interference between the three mechanisms, each of which are set on one of the four spokes of b1. Thus there is one new grounded gear (one was identified in the wreckage, and the second is shared by two of the planets), one gear used to reverse the direction of the sun anomaly, three epicyclic gears and three bars/coaxial tubes/pointers, which would qualify as another gear each: five gears and three slotted bars in all.

The superior planet systems—Mars, Jupiter, and Saturn—all follow the same general principle of the lunar anomaly mechanism. Similar to the inferior systems, each has a gear whose centre pivot is on an extension of b1, and which meshes with a grounded gear. It presents a pin and a centre pivot for the epicyclic gear which has a slot for the pin, and which meshes with a gear fixed to a coaxial tube and thence to the pointer. Each of the three mechanisms can fit within a quadrant of the b1 extension, and they are thus all on a single plane parallel with the front dial plate. Each one uses a ground gear, a driving gear, a driven gear, and a gear/coaxial tube/pointer, thus, twelve gears additional in all.

In total, there are eight coaxial spindles of various nested sizes to transfer the rotations in the mechanism to the eight pointers. So in all, there are 30 original gears, seven gears added to complete calendar functionality, 17 gears and three slotted bars to support the six new pointers, for a grand total of 54 gears, three bars, and eight pointers in Freeth and Jones' design.

On the visual representation Freeth supplies in the paper, the pointers on the front zodiac dial have small, round identifying stones. He mentions a quote from an ancient papyrus:

In 2018, based on computed tomography scans, the Antikythera Mechanism Research Project proposed changes in gearing and produced mechanical parts based on this.

In March 2021, the Antikythera Research Team at University College London, led by Freeth, published their proposed reconstruction of the entire Antikythera Mechanism.

Accuracy
Investigations by Freeth and Jones reveal that their simulated mechanism is not particularly accurate, the Mars pointer being up to 38° off at times (these inaccuracies occur at the nodal points of Mars' retrograde motion, and the error recedes at other locations in the orbit). This is not due to inaccuracies in gearing ratios in the mechanism, but rather due to inadequacies in the Greek theory of planetary movements. The accuracy could not have been improved until ca. 160 AD when Ptolemy published his Almagest (particularly by adding the concept of the equant to his theory), then much later by the introduction of Kepler's laws of planetary motion in 1609 and 1619.

In addition to theoretical accuracy, there is the matter of mechanical accuracy. Freeth and Jones note that the inevitable "looseness" in the mechanism due to the hand-built gears, with their triangular teeth and the frictions between gears, and in bearing surfaces, probably would have swamped the finer solar and lunar correction mechanisms built into it:

While the device itself may have struggled with inaccuracies due to the triangular teeth being hand-made, the calculations used and the technology implemented to create the elliptical paths of the planets and retrograde motion of the Moon and Mars by using a clockwork-type gear train with the addition of a pin-and-slot epicyclic mechanism predated that of the first known clocks found in antiquity in Medieval Europe by more than 1000 years. Archimedes' development of the approximate value of pi and his theory of centres of gravity, along with the steps he made towards developing the calculus, all suggest that the Greeks had access to more than enough mathematical knowledge beyond that of just Babylonian algebra in order to be able to model the elliptical nature of planetary motion.

Similar devices in ancient literature

Roman world 
Cicero's De re publica (54-51 BC), a first century BC philosophical dialogue, mentions two machines that some modern authors consider as some kind of planetarium or orrery, predicting the movements of the Sun, the Moon, and the five planets known at that time. They were both built by Archimedes and brought to Rome by the Roman general Marcus Claudius Marcellus after the death of Archimedes at the siege of Syracuse in 212 BC. Marcellus had great respect for Archimedes and one of these machines was the only item he kept from the siege (the second was placed in the Temple of Virtue). The device was kept as a family heirloom, and Cicero has Philus (one of the participants in a conversation that Cicero imagined had taken place in a villa belonging to Scipio Aemilianus in the year 129 BC) saying that Gaius Sulpicius Gallus (consul with Marcellus's nephew in 166 BC, and credited by Pliny the Elder as the first Roman to have written a book explaining solar and lunar eclipses) gave both a "learned explanation" and a working demonstration of the device.

Pappus of Alexandria (290 – ) stated that Archimedes had written a now lost manuscript on the construction of these devices titled On Sphere-Making. The surviving texts from ancient times describe many of his creations, some even containing simple drawings. One such device is his odometer, the exact model later used by the Romans to place their mile markers (described by Vitruvius, Heron of Alexandria and in the time of Emperor Commodus). The drawings in the text appeared functional, but attempts to build them as pictured had failed. When the gears pictured, which had square teeth, were replaced with gears of the type in the Antikythera mechanism, which were angled, the device was perfectly functional.

If Cicero's account is correct, then this technology existed as early as the third century BC. Archimedes' device is also mentioned by later Roman era writers such as Lactantius (Divinarum Institutionum Libri VII), Claudian (In sphaeram Archimedes), and Proclus (Commentary on the first book of Euclid's Elements of Geometry) in the fourth and fifth centuries.

Cicero also said that another such device was built "recently" by his friend Posidonius, "... each one of the revolutions of which brings about the same movement in the Sun and Moon and five wandering stars [planets] as is brought about each day and night in the heavens ..."

It is unlikely that any one of these machines was the Antikythera mechanism found in the shipwreck since both the devices fabricated by Archimedes and mentioned by Cicero were located in Rome at least 30 years later than the estimated date of the shipwreck, and the third device was almost certainly in the hands of Posidonius by that date. The scientists who have reconstructed the Antikythera mechanism also agree that it was too sophisticated to have been a unique device.

Eastern Mediterranean and others 

This evidence that the Antikythera mechanism was not unique adds support to the idea that there was an ancient Greek tradition of complex mechanical technology that was later, at least in part, transmitted to the Byzantine and Islamic worlds, where mechanical devices which were complex, albeit simpler than the Antikythera mechanism, were built during the Middle Ages. Fragments of a geared calendar attached to a sundial, from the fifth or sixth century Byzantine Empire, have been found; the calendar may have been used to assist in telling time. In the Islamic world, Banū Mūsā's Kitab al-Hiyal, or Book of Ingenious Devices, was commissioned by the Caliph of Baghdad in the early 9th century AD. This text described over a hundred mechanical devices, some of which may date back to ancient Greek texts preserved in monasteries. A geared calendar similar to the Byzantine device was described by the scientist al-Biruni around 1000, and a surviving 13th-century astrolabe also contains a similar clockwork device. It is possible that this medieval technology may have been transmitted to Europe and contributed to the development of mechanical clocks there.

In the 11th century, Chinese polymath Su Song constructed a mechanical clock tower that told (among other measurements) the position of some stars and planets, which were shown on a mechanically rotated armillary sphere.

Popular culture and museum replicas 
On 17 May 2017, Google marked the 115th anniversary of the discovery with a Google Doodle.

, the Antikythera mechanism was displayed as part of a temporary exhibition about the Antikythera shipwreck, accompanied by reconstructions made by Ioannis Theofanidis, Derek de Solla Price, Michael Wright, the Thessaloniki University and Dionysios Kriaris. Other reconstructions are on display at the American Computer Museum in Bozeman, Montana, at the Children's Museum of Manhattan in New York, at Astronomisch-Physikalisches Kabinett in Kassel, Germany, and at the Musée des Arts et Métiers in Paris.

The National Geographic documentary series Naked Science had an episode dedicated to the Antikythera Mechanism entitled "Star Clock BC" that aired on 20 January 2011. A documentary, The World's First Computer, was produced in 2012 by the Antikythera mechanism researcher and film-maker Tony Freeth. In 2012, BBC Four aired The Two-Thousand-Year-Old Computer; it was also aired on 3 April 2013 in the United States on NOVA, the PBS science series, under the name Ancient Computer. It documents the discovery and 2005 investigation of the mechanism by the Antikythera Mechanism Research Project.

A functioning Lego reconstruction of the Antikythera mechanism was built in 2010 by hobbyist Andy Carol, and featured in a short film produced by Small Mammal in 2011. Several exhibitions have been staged worldwide, leading to the main "Antikythera shipwreck" exhibition at the National Archaeological Museum in Athens, Greece.

The YouTube channel Clickspring documents the creation of an Antikythera mechanism replica using the tools, techniques and materials that would have been available in ancient Greece, along with investigations into the possible technologies of the era.

See also
 Archimedes Palimpsest
 Astrarium
 Automaton
 Ctesibius
 Reverse engineering
 Ancient technology

References

Further reading

Books

Journals

 
 
 
 
 
 
  (The authors mention that an "extended account" of their researches titled "Computing Aphrodite" is forthcoming in 2001, but it does not seem to have appeared yet.)

Other

  Hublot.

External links

 
 
 
 YAAS – Een 3D interactive virtual reality simulator in VRML
 
 
 
Metapage with links at antikythera.org
 Bronze replica 3D engineering manufacturing drawings and operating manual

3rd-century BC works
2nd-century BC works
1st-century BC works
1902 archaeological discoveries
1902 in Greece
Ancient Greek astronomy
Ancient Greek science
Ancient Greek technology
Analog computers
Archaeoastronomy
Archaeological artifacts
Archaeological discoveries in Greece
Astronomical instruments
Greek inventions
Hellenistic engineering
History of computing
History of mathematics
History of science
History of technology
Mechanical calculators
Mechanical computers
National Archaeological Museum, Athens